Dave Gibson is a Scottish singer and writer of Grammy, CMA and CMT nominated, and BMI award-winning songs. He has lived in Los Angeles, California since 2015.

Since then, he has collaborated with many artists and producers, including Bruno Mars, Philip Lawrence, MXM, Stargate, Rodney "Darkchild" Jerkins, BURNS, Gitty, James Arthur, Lukas Graham, Louis Tomlinson, G-Eazy, Toni Braxton, Jessie J, Mary J. Blige, Keith Urban, Tim McGraw and Faith Hill.

Discography

References 

Living people
Scottish singer-songwriters
Place of birth missing (living people)
Year of birth missing (living people)